Prophorostoma is a genus of parasitic flies in the family Tachinidae. There are at least two described species in Prophorostoma.

Species
Prophorostoma pulchrum Townsend, 1927
Prophorostoma tomjobimi Nihei, 2006

References

Dexiinae
Diptera of South America
Monotypic Brachycera genera
Taxa named by Charles Henry Tyler Townsend
Tachinidae genera